Charlotte Margarete Fürstin von Lieven (Née Baroness von Gaugreben; 1748–1828), was a Russian princess of German origin and an Imperial governess.

Early life
She was born as daughter of Carl Caspar, Baron von Gaugreben (1716-1767) and Baroness Agnes Posse of Säby (b.1727). Charlotte married Baron Otto Heinrich von Lieven (1726-1781), member of one of the oldest aristocratic families of German Baltic origin.

Court life
She was in 1783 appointed with the task of educating his daughters and younger sons - Nicholas and Mikhail Pavlovich. She had a strong and influential position within the contemporary Russian court.

References

Alexander von Lieven: Der General Baron Otto Heinrich von Lieven und seine Gemahlin, die Staatsdame Charlotte geb. Freiin von Gaugreben, Fürstin. Riga 1915

1748 births
1828 deaths
Nobility from the Russian Empire
Ladies-in-waiting from the Russian Empire
Governesses from the Russian Empire
Governesses to the Imperial Russian court